Jordan E. Cooper is a queer American playwright whose Broadway debut with Ain't No Mo', for which he won a Special Citation Obie Award, made him the youngest Black American playwright on Broadway.

Other works include Black Boy Fly, Mama Got a Cough and The Ms. Pat Show, for which he also serves as showrunner.

References

American dramatists and playwrights
Obie Award recipients
Year of birth missing (living people)
Living people